The Museum of Christian Art, in the former colonial capital of Old Goa, is a museum of Christian art. The museum reopened on 23 May 2022 after significant upgrades.

The museum which was initially set up to display these unique works of art, evolved over the years into a space focused on creating awareness on conservation and restoration of art and architecture through various activities and collaborations. Noteworthy among these are the restoration of the 17th. century, State protected monument, The Church of Santa Monica and conservation of the museum's collection.

About

The museum is located in the Convent of Santa Monica in Old Goa, Goa.Renovation and refurbishment took place from 2017 to 2020, it was “upgraded” but the reopening was postponed partly due to the pandemic. In 2022 the museum was re-opened with several improvements.

It is a project of the Archdiocese of Goa and was set up with technical and financial assistance from the Calouste Gulbenkian Foundation, Portugal and the Indian National Trust for Art and Cultural Heritage (INTACH), New Delhi. Earlier, it was located at the Seminary of Rachol, Salcete, Goa. The museum houses an exquisite and unique collection of Christian art objects in ivory, gold and silver, wood and textiles spanning from the 16th century to mid-20th century. Recognized the World over as a perfect symbiosis of two cultural manifestations, Indian and European, these art objects, now referred to as Indo Portuguese art, are known, besides their antiquity, for their distinct Indian contribution.  The museum is marked as a MUST SEE in most International travel guides and has received, over the years, many visitors, research scholars and dignitaries not only from India but also from all over the World. Further, as evidence of its recognition, art objects from the museum's collection have featured in International art exhibitions in India, Japan, Europe and Australia. A prized item of the museum, the Pelican Monstrance and Tabernacle, had pride of place in exhibitions in Mumbai and Delhi –INDIA & THE WORLD - A history in nine stories created in partnership between CSMVS Mumbai, The British Museum, London and the National Museum, New Delhi.

Exhibits

Its exhibits are divided into the following categories:
 Sculptures
 Furniture
 Ivory
 Paintings
 Textiles
 Precious Metals
 Metals
 Miscellaneous

Statuary, paintings, sculptures

The Lonely Planet says: "Within the Convent of St. Monica, the excellent Museum of Christian Art contains statuary, paintings and sculptures transferred here from the Rachol Seminary. Many of the works of Goan Christian art during the Portuguese era were produced by local Hindu artists."

Religious silverware

Fodors, another travel guide, notes that the museum is located inside the Convent of St. Monica, and "has a number of objects of Christian interest, including paintings and religious silverware, some dating back to the 16th century." It also notes that this convent was the first nunnery of its kind in the East and continued until the late 19th century.

Christian art, elsewhere

In Goa, the Goa State Museum also houses a Christian Art Gallery. In August 2011, Mumbai also announced plans to open its museum of Christian art.

Art heist

In January 2012, a major art heist was reported at the museum. There was no detailed listing of the items that were stolen, in a case which saw a security guard being killed. Two items of precious metal were stolen from the collection. The justice is still awaited in court proceedings.

References

External links

Official website.
Another website for MoCA. Takes time to load.

Museums in Goa
Christian art
Christianity in Goa
Old Goa
Year of establishment missing